Stigmella ficivora is a moth of the family Nepticulidae. It was described by Gustafsson in 1985. It is endemic to Gambia where it is found only in one city called Bakau.

The larvae feed on Ficus parasitica species. They probably mine the leaves of their host plant.

References

Nepticulidae
Moths described in 1985
Endemic fauna of the Gambia
Moths of Africa